Super Conflict is a turn-based strategy video game that was released for the Super NES. It is the sequel to Conflict for the NES.

Gameplay

The player assumes the role of a commander of combined forces. The scope of each battle and the number and variety of military units available to fight with, increases as the game progresses. The game was marketed as gulf war themed, but gameplay is more consistent with potential cold war scenarios. 
There are two modes: short (which allows players to plan strategic battles without any tactical consequences) and long (which allows all units to participate in up to four rounds of constant warfare).  The blue forces are armed with American weapons while the red forces are armed with Soviet-made weapons.

Super Conflict is a military simulation game played on a hex map in which players try to capture the opponent's "Flag Tank" or "Flag Ship". The map consists of various terrain tiles with movement and defense modifiers. For example, bridges and deserts lower the defense ratings of occupying troops; hills and mountains provide additional defenses but require more fuel to move through. There are over 55 different scenarios and 16 two-player scenarios.

Notes

References

External links
 Game Spot
 Official Magazine Advertisement

1993 video games
Super Nintendo Entertainment System games
Super Nintendo Entertainment System-only games
Top-down video games
Vic Tokai games
Video games set in the Middle East
Multiplayer and single-player video games
Video games developed in the United States